Thermia is a genus of air-breathing land snails, terrestrial pulmonate gastropod mollusks in the family Charopidae.

Species 
Species in the genus Thermia include:
 Thermia cressida (Hutton, 1883)
 Thermia subincarnata (Suter, 1894) 
 Thermia virescens (Suter, 1899)

References

External links

Charopidae